Syed Riaz Ahsan (24 December 1951 – 8 September 2008) was a Pakistani statistician and mathematician who has worked in applied statistics, applied analysis, applications of special functions. He was a noted professor of applied statistics in University of Karachi, Karachi. Previously, he has served as the president of Sindh Professors and Lecturers’ Association (SPLA). Prof. Riaz Ahsan was born on 24 December 1951 and he died on 8 September 2008.

Education and career

Born in Karachi, Ahsan had his initial education at the BYJ School, Karachi, and completed his intermediate from Adamjee Government Science College, Karachi. He received his  B.Sc. (Hons)  in Statistics and Mathematics. He did his M.Sc with distinctions in Statistics  and M.A. in Mathematics with honors from Karachi University. Later, he received his double Ph.D. in applied statistics and applied mathematics from the same alma mater in 1974.

Academic career

In 1975, he started his career from DJ Science College, Karachi. He also served as the president of Sindh Professors and Lecturers Association  (SPLA) that works for the betterment of professors and lecturers in the province of Sindh. In 1982, he went to Nigeria on deputation and taught statistics and mathematics at the University of Nigeria, Nsukka. Upon his return continued as a teacher at the Government Degree Science College, Karachi, from where he was later transferred to Saint Patrick's College, Karachi. In early 1990s, Ahsan joined Karachi University as a full professor of statistics and mathematics and continued his career until his death.

Death
Dr. Ahsan was diagnosed with cancer in one of his legs in 2004 and was on medication since then. He recovered for a while and participated in many campaigns launched by the SPLA and fell ill again in 2008, never to recover.
Registrar Prof. Raees Alvi paid him the following tribute: “He was a wise man who always guided teachers in the right direction. He always searched for development and never had any prejudice. He always worked for the promotion of merit. This great man always fought for the rights of teachers and I would call it an irreparable loss for all of us.”

"The void he left behind can never be filled. It is a huge loss for SPLA and we would never get a personality like him in future". SPLA Senior Vice-president Manzoor Hussain Chishti said.

Family
His father, Professor Syed Zaheer Ahsan, was a professor of Geography at Karachi University.

References

External links
http://news.newsupdate.pk/?2008/9/9+396508
http://www.dinnews.tv/dinnews/national/prof_riaz_ahsan_passes_away-7348.aspx
 Prof. Riaz Ahsan

Academic staff of the University of Karachi
Pakistani mathematicians
Pakistani statisticians
1951 births
2008 deaths
Academic staff of the University of Nigeria